Public Allies is an American nonprofit organization that operates an AmeriCorps program and is dedicated to leadership development. Its mission is to create a just and equitable society and the diverse leadership to sustain it.

History
Public Allies was founded in 1992 by Vanessa Kirsch and Katrina Browne, recent college graduates who wanted to challenge the notion that their generation was apathetic and uncaring. Grounded in the belief that the untapped energy and idealism of young people can be a powerful force for transforming communities, Kirsch and Browne created Public Allies to provide a pipeline for diverse young leaders to begin careers in public life.

The first Public Allies program was launched in Washington, D.C. with 14 Allies (members), with funding from the John D. and Catherine T. MacArthur Foundation and Surdna Foundation.  Its first year, the program also received a demonstration grant from the Commission for National and Community Service, under President George H. W. Bush.

In 1993, Public Allies Chicago was launched with 30 Allies under the leadership of founding Executive Director Michelle Obama. She served as Chicago director until 1996, and then as a national board member from 1997 to 2001. Also in 1993, President Bill Clinton named Public Allies as a model for national service.

In 1994, Public Allies, along with Habitat for Humanity and YouthBuild, were among the first recipients of AmeriCorps grants, which allowed for expansion to Delaware, Milwaukee, and North Carolina. In 1995, Public Allies opened a site Silicon Valley and San Francisco, followed by Cincinnati (1998), New York and Los Angeles (1999), and Eagle Rock, Colorado (2002).  Additional sites include Connecticut (2004); Arizona and Pittsburgh (2006); Miami, New Mexico, and San Antonio (2007); Indianapolis and Maryland (2009); Central Florida and the Twin Cities (2010); and Detroit and Iowa (2013).

In 2018, Jaime E. Uzeta was appointed CEO, replacing Adren O. Wilson, Ph.D., who served since 2014, and Paul Schmitz, who had served since 2000.

Public Allies has nearly 10,000 alumni.

In July 2022, the organization fired many staff and directors who were pushing for better pay and working conditions. Shortly after the Public Allies Board of Directors accepted the resignation of Uzeta, Jenise Terrell, a Public Allies alumna and long-time staffer, was appointed as the Interim CEO. In February 2023, Terrell was named CEO of Public Allies.

Logo
The Public Allies logo draws on Native American tradition to illustrate the impact individuals can have on their world. The handprint depicted in the logo represents the mark that people leave on their communities and on the people they touch in the course of their lives. The red swirl stands for the energy and idealism that drive people to serve their communities. The seven rays refer to a philosophy regarding the interconnectedness of the generations—the belief that an individual living today has been influenced by the three preceding generations and that the individual will go on to leave a legacy impacting the three generations to follow.

Mission and programs
Public Allies' mission is to create a just and equitable society and the diverse leadership to sustain it. They are changing the face and practice of leadership in communities across the country by demonstrating our conviction that everyone can lead, and that lasting social change results when citizens of all backgrounds step up, take responsibility, and work together.

There are multiple Public Allies sites nationwide, many of which are operated in partnership with a local nonprofit organization or university. More than 80% of Allies come from the communities in which they serve.

Public Allies has employed three main strategies to deliver its mission: 1) Paid apprenticeship and leadership program in partnership with AmeriCorps, 2) Alumni engagement, and 3) Advocacy.

Apprenticeship 
Public Allies combines a 10-month nonprofit apprenticeship program with a community-centered, values-based approach to foster leadership development. For four days each week, Allies serve at a community-based nonprofit, and the fifth day is devoted to rigorous leadership training.  All members also engage in a number of community service projects.

Alumni engagement 
Public Allies continues to develop the leadership practice (i.e., their skills, career and network) and impact of the Alumni of its AmeriCorps Apprenticeship Program (#PAAlum) and those who've worked at Public Allies (#StaffAlum).  As of October 2022, there are nearly 9,000 that comprise this network.

More than 85% of program graduates continue their careers in nonprofit and public service. In 2014, Public Allies organized its first Alumni Summit on Black Male Achievement in Washington, D.C.  Summit attendees included 30 African American male program graduates, who advised White House officials on the Administration’s “My Brother's Keeper” initiative.

Advocacy 
Public Allies has been a leader in efforts to build the next generation of diverse talent and leadership for the non-profit sector. It has influenced the national service field to become more inclusive and has been seen as a pathway to opportunity. Working with Voices for National Service, the White House Council for Community Solutions, The Aspen Institute, and the Service Pathways Initiative, Public Allies played a major role in influencing AmeriCorps, the Corporation for National and Community Service, and the broader national service field to increase the diversity of the people engaging in national service.

Core values 
Public Allies’ six core values are integrated into the program: 
Collaboration: The ability to facilitate, negotiate, build consensus, build strong teams, and empower others.
Continuous Learning: The ability to question assumptions and beliefs, understand strengths and shortcomings, and commit to continued growth within a community context.
Diversity & Inclusion: The ability to work effectively and inclusively with different people and understand how to adapt to different cultures and environments.
Focus on Assets: The ability to catalyze the natural leadership of everyone, be truly accountable to those served, and approach opportunities for change with awareness of community assets.
Integrity: The ability to meet commitments, act responsibly with public and personal trust, and be accountable for words and actions.
Innovation: The ability to respond to demographic, political and social shifts by acting in creative ways that generate new solutions.

Geographical reach and operating partners 
Public Allies partners with nonprofit organizations and universities to operate multiple Public Allies sites nationwide.

Alumni 
 Michelle Obama (Founding Executive Director, Public Allies Chicago '93), former First Lady of the United States
Vanessa Kirsch (Co-founder and President & CEO '92 – '96), Founder and CEO, New Profit Inc.
Sasheer Zamata (New York ’10), cast member, Saturday Night Live
Omar Brownson (Silicon Valley '97), the Executive Director at Los Angeles River Revitalization Commission
Jason Holton, (Milwaukee and National Office), Executive Director & Vice President at City Year Milwaukee
Joe Matassino (Delaware '00), Director of Development at Delaware Center for Horticulture
Kelly Zen-Yie Tsai (Chicago '00), Spoken Word Poet / Filmmaker / Interdisciplinary Artist
Matt Darby (Central Florida, '14), former NFL player with the Buffalo Bills
Abel Nunez (Washington DC '97) is the Executive Director at Central America Resource Center - DC
Travis Rejman (Chicago '95), Executive Director at The Goldin Institute
Jose Rico (Chicago '94), Executive Director at White House Initiative on Educational Excellence for Hispanics
Charles McKinney (North Carolina '96, Program Staff of Public Allies North Carolina '97 – '99), Professor of Africana Studies at Rhodes College of Memphis, Tennessee
Malik Yusef (Chicago '97), poet and Grammy Award-winning recording artist.

See also 
AmeriCorps
Teach For America
City Year

References

1992 establishments in the United States
AmeriCorps organizations
Leadership training
Organizations established in 1992
Service year programs in the United States